The Housing Authority of Fiji is in the business of providing homes to the people of Fiji. The authority sells fully serviced residential lots and offers residential mortgage loans for residential purposes.

External links
Housing Authority of Fiji

Public housing
Government agencies of Fiji
Economy of Fiji
Housing organizations